The European route E91 or E91 is a European route running from Toprakkale in Turkey to the border of Syria near Yayladağı. It is 170 kilometres long.

The route has been recorded by UNECE as follows: Toprakkale - Iskenderun - Topboğazı - Antakya - Yayladağı - Syria.

Route 

: Toprakkale - Iskenderun
: Iskenderun - Topboğazı 
: Topboğazı - Antakya - Yayladağı
 
 Route 1: Kessab

References

External links 
 UN Economic Commission for Europe: Overall Map of E-road Network (2007)

91
E091